Marguerite Kathryn Flecknoe is an American voice actress, radio personality, television host and producer.

Biography 
Flecknoe graduated with honors and a Bachelor of Science degree in Journalism and Broadcast News, and a minor in Theatre from the University of Colorado at Boulder in May 2005. That summer she started graduate studies at Harvard University and the Moscow Art Theatre School where she earned a master's degree in theater.

Career 
Flecknoe has done a variety of work from appearing in a commercial with Yao Ming, to doing voiceover work for Japanese anime. In 2009, she played the role of Mrs. Elizabeth Corban in a local production of Catch Me If You Can. Flecknoe is also known for providing the voice for several characters for ADV Films and Sentai Filmworks/Seraphim Digital. She has also worked as an entertainment, news, and traffic reporter for 	Newsradio 740 KTRH and 790 ESPN Radio, the Sports Animal. Currently, she produces and hosts a regular online segment on KIAH-TV (CW affiliate in Houston) called the Online Dish and has also helped with their morning news program No Wait Weather + Traffic.

Filmography

Anime roles
 Akame ga Kill! – Kijie (Bols' Wife, Ep. 13), Mez (Ep. 18)
After the Rain – Yui Nishida
 Amnesia – Heroine
 Another – Tomoka Inose (Ep. 7), Additional Voices
 BanG Dream! 2nd Season – Arisa Ichigaya
 Battle Girls: Time Paradox – Yoshimoto Imagawa
 Best Student Council – Mami Aoki
 Bodacious Space Pirates – Belinda Percy
 Broken Blade – Lee
 Btooom! – Shiki Murasaki
 Campione! – Lucrezia Zora
 Clannad – Yukine Miyazawa
 Comic Party Revolution – Sawada
 Demon King Daimao – Korone
 Devil May Cry: The Animated Series – Cindy
 Dream Eater Merry – Ichima, Nao Horie
 Diabolik Lovers – Yui Komori
 Fate/kaleid liner Prisma Illya – Irisviel von Einzbern
 The Garden of Words – Yukari Yukino
 Ghost Hound – Aya Komagusu,
 Girls und Panzer – Piyotan, Yuuki Utsugi
 Haikyuu!! – Yui Michimiya
 Heaven's Memo Pad – Miku Kimura
 Highschool of the Dead – Saya Takagi
 Horizon in the Middle of Nowhere – Kimi Aoi, Naomasa (Season 2)
 ICE – Aoi
 Kakegurui – Yumemi Yumemite (Sentai Filmworks dub)
 Kamisama Dolls – Kuko Kawahari
 Kanon – Shiori Misaka
 Kiba – Aisha
 Kids on the Slope – Yurika Fukahori
 La storia della Arcana Famiglia – Meriella
 Legends of the Dark King – Isabella
 Log Horizon – Marielle
 Love, Chunibyo & Other Delusions – Shinka Nibutani
 MM! – Yumi Mamiya
 Majestic Prince – Teoria
 Majikoi! – Oh! Samurai Girls – Ami Itagaki, Tsubame Matsunaga
 Medaka Box – Mogana Kikajima
 My Youth Romantic Comedy Is Wrong, As I Expected - Mori-chan
 Momo: The Girl God of Death – Eko Miyazaki (Ep. 5)
 Nakaimo - My Sister is Among Them! – Rinka Kunitachi
 Needless – Aruka Schild, Seto
 Night Raid 1931 – Lili (Ep. 3),  Shunyo Akitsuki (Ep. 0), Additional Voices
 Nyan Koi! – Kanako Sumiyoshi
 Pani Poni Dash! – Ichijo
 Parasyte – Kana Kimishima
 Penguindrum – Masako Natsume
 Peter Grill and the Philosopher's Time - Lucy
 Phi Brain: Puzzle of God – Miharu Sakanoue
 Project Blue Earth SOS – Maggie
 Red Garden – Rachel Benning
 Rifle is Beautiful – Misa Kuroi
 Samurai Girls – Hanzo Hattori (credited as Ophelia Cox)
 The Seven Heavenly Virtues - Gabriel
 Shattered Angels – Setsuna
 Shining Hearts: Shiawase no Pan – Amil
 To Love Ru – Saki Tenjōin
 Tokyo Majin –  Hinano Oribe, Sera Rikudo
 Tsuritama – Misaki Shimano
 Tokyo Magnitude 8.0 – Masami Onozawa, Megu
 Un-Go – Kumi Yasuda (Ep. 0)
 Upotte!! – Sako
 Venus Versus Virus – Risa
 Wasteful Days of High School Girls – Minami "Yamai" Yamamoto
 Waiting in the Summer – Mio Kitahara
 Why the Hell are You Here, Teacher!? – Kana Kojima
 When Supernatural Battles Became Commonplace – Sayumi Takanashi
 The World God Only Knows – Kusunoki Kasuga, Miss Nikido (Seasons 2-3, OVAs), Nora
 Xam'd Lost Memories'' – Prois Sukakki

Awards and nominations

Notes

References

External links

 at CW39

American radio reporters and correspondents
American stage actresses
American television actresses
American voice actresses
Harvard University alumni
Living people
Actresses from Houston
University of Colorado alumni
Actresses from Colorado
21st-century American actresses
American television reporters and correspondents
Journalists from Houston
Institute for Advanced Theater Training, Harvard University alumni
American women television journalists
American women radio journalists
Year of birth missing (living people)